Faridpur Engineering College (FEC) is a public undergraduate college in Faridpur, Bangladesh. It was established in 2010. It is located in Baitul Aman Faridpur town of Faridpur District.

History
Construction of the Education Engineering Department began in 2005, financed by the government of Bangladesh. The main work was completed in 2010, while the electricity and water connections were finished in 2013.

Affiliation
Faridpur Engineering College is affiliated with University of Dhaka under the Faculty of Engineering and Technology.

Campus
All departments are housed in a multi-story building on a campus of approximately 12 acres. its 10 buildings include an administrative building, three faculty buildings, a cafeteria, a bank, a post office, a library and an auditorium. Three residence halls provide student accommodation, one for women and two for men.

Departments
 Department of Electrical and Electronic Engineering(EEE)
 Department of Civil Engineering(CE)
 Department of Computer Science and Engineering(CSE)

Undergraduate courses

Scholarships opportunities
Each semester, the Government of Bangladesh awards scholarships of 1,950 BDT per student based on his/her CGPA (Top 30% per batch or department with the majority 50% female quota). After graduation, students receive further opportunities to study abroad through scholarships awarded according to the University of Dhaka's merit list.

Admission
Entry to undergraduate courses of Faridpur Engineering College is controlled by Dhaka University. Admission is given based on S.S.C. and H.S.C levels. Test scores and GPA or equivalent examinations.

Associations & Clubs 

 FECSRA - Faridpur Engineering College Science & Research Association
 FECRSG - Faridpur Engineering College Rover Scout Group
 FECSA - Faridpur Engineering College Sports Association
 Swopno Sarothi Foundation 
 FECLC- Faridpur Engineering College Language Club
 FECJPC - Faridpur Engineering College Job Placement Cell
 FECDA- Faridpur Engineering College Debating Association 
 FECBAC - Faridpur Engineering College Bani Arrchana Club
 FECIDC - Faridpur Engineering College Islami Dawah Centre

See also
Mymensingh Engineering College
Sylhet Engineering College
Barisal Engineering College

References

External links
 

University of Dhaka
Colleges in Faridpur District
Educational institutions established in 2013
2013 establishments in Bangladesh
Engineering universities and colleges in Bangladesh